Bitter Sweet is a 2015 Taiwanese romance television series produced by Sanlih E-Television, starring Ma Zhi Qin, Johnny Kou, Sunny Tu, Esther Liu, Steven Sun, Esther Yang, Xiu Jie Kai, Michael Zhang, and Ahn Zhe as the main cast. Filming began on July 8, 2015, and wrapped up in October 30, 2015. First original broadcast began July 23, 2015, on SETTV channel, airing weekly from Monday till Friday at 8:00-9:00 pm.

Synopsis
A decorated military career will only carry you so far with your own children. Wang Da Shan (Kou Shi Xun) is a retired army colonel who tries to run his household with the same military precision and authority. But his four adult children, Shang Wen (Esther Liu), Shang Huan (Tracy Chou), Shang Hao, and Shang Mo, and his aging mother see his barked orders as toothless bites and don’t take him very seriously. As the strong-willed and smart eldest daughter, Shang Wen is highly successful as the editor of an international fashion magazine, but Da Shan worries about her future as she is nearing 30 and is still single. Shang Huan works for a travel agency organizing dating events and is a valued employee but always lives under the shadow of her successful older sister. When Yang Yu Fan (Xiu Jie Kai), a cadet under Da Shan’s charge, and Zhu Li Ting (Michael Zhang), a second-generation young master, both fall for Shang Huan, how will it complicate her personal and professional life?

Cast

Main cast

 as Jiang Tian Ai 
 as Wang Da Shan 
 as Ye Zhi Lin 
Esther Liu as Wang Shang Wen 
 as Wang Shang Huan 
 as Wang Shang Hao 
Esther Yang as Wang Shang Mo 
 as Yang Yu Fan 
 as Zhu Yu Ting
 as Du Zheng Hui

Supporting cast

 as Liu Mu Sen 
 as Huang En Ci 
Yorke Sun as Jiang An Jie 
 as Ai Mei Xin 
 as Li Zhi Xiang 
 as Zhang Zhi Yuan 
Zhan Jia Ru as Lin Shang Jun 
 as Peng Cheng You 
Le Le / Rou Rou as Du Tian Tian 
Liu Ji Fan as Lee
 as Zheng Fen Ling 
Lan Jing Heng as Xiao Long 
 as Ai Sheng Li 
 as Di Xiang

Cameo

Yang En Ti as Lin Xiao Ling 
 as Joe
Huang Yi Yan as May
Liu Yu Wei as Rui Rui 
Huang Tai An as Guan Zhu 
 as Zhi Xiang's father
Zhou Ying as Fei Fei 
Qi Yi Guo as battalion chief counselor
Li Rui Shen as Mr. Mao
 as Da Tou 
Chen Jian An as reporter
Cindy Yen as Tracy
Chien Te-men as Lu Qiang 
 as Tina
 as CEO Xue
 as Zhi Xiang's mother

Soundtrack
"Something" by Yen-j 
"Dare To Be Lonely In Someone Else Arms 我敢在你懷裡孤獨" by Rene Liu 
"The Past 過往" by Yen-j
"Give 一直給" by Yen-j
"Eternal Happiness 永恆的快樂" by Yen-j
"Move Forward 往前" by Cosmospeople 
"I Can't Help But To Love You 我無法不愛你" by Magic Power
"You Have Always Been Here 原來你都在" by Della Ding 
"To Home 寫信回家" by Rene Liu
"Peaceful Time 歲月靜好" by Rene Liu

Broadcast

Episode ratings

Awards and nominations

References

External links
Bitter Sweet SETTV Official website 
Bitter Sweet ETTV Website 
Bitter Sweet Official Facebook page 

Eastern Television original programming
2015 Taiwanese television series debuts
2015 Taiwanese television series endings
Sanlih E-Television original programming
Taiwanese romance television series
Twins in fiction